Feitian may refer to:

Feitian space suit, a Chinese space suit
Feitian Technologies Co., Ltd., an information security provider in China
Feitian, the Chinese word for apsara, a flying deva of Hindu and Buddhist mythology
Feitian Awards, short name of Flying Apsaras Awards, Chinese TV awards ceremony

Chinese place
 Feitian, Leiyang (淝田镇), a town of Leiyang City, Hunan.